Rúben Filipe Canedo Amaral (born 19 October 2001) is a Portuguese professional footballer who plays as a left-back for Al Wahda.

Club career
Canedo grew up in the youth academy of Porto, playing for them once in the UEFA Youth League in February 2020. In September 2020, he joined UAE Pro League side Al Wahda. On 21 November 2020, he made his professional league debut, playing 61 minutes in a 3–0 win over Ajman.

Career statistics

Club

References

External links

Living people
2001 births
Sportspeople from Vila Nova de Gaia
Association football fullbacks
Portuguese footballers
Al Wahda FC players
UAE Pro League players
Portuguese expatriate footballers
Expatriate footballers in the United Arab Emirates
Portuguese expatriate sportspeople in the United Arab Emirates